St Cuthbert may refer to:

English saints
St Cuthbert (634–687)
Cuthbert of Canterbury (d. 760)
Cuthbert Mayne (1544–1577)

St Cuthbert or St Cuthbert's may also refer to
Places
Saint-Cuthbert, Quebec, a municipality in Canada
St Cuthbert Out, a civil parish in Somerset, England
St Cuthbert Without, a civil parish in Cumbria, England
St. Cuthbert's Mission, an indigenous village in Guyana
Churches
St Cuthbert's Church (disambiguation)
Educational institutions
St Cuthbert's Catholic High School, St Helens, England
St Cuthbert's College (disambiguation)
St Cuthbert's High School, Newcastle upon Tyne, England
St Cuthbert's RC High School, Rochdale, England
St Cuthbert's Roman Catholic Primary School, Stockton on Tees, England
St Cuthbert's Society, a college of the University of Durham, England
Other
St Cuthbert Gospel, a 7th-century gospel pocket book
Saint Cuthbert (Dungeons & Dragons), a deity in the Dungeons and Dragons game
St Cuthbert's Cave, Northumberland, England
St. Cuthbert's Co-operative Society, Scotland
St Cuthbert's Swallet, a cave in Somerset, England